Route 163 is a state highway in southeastern Connecticut running from Montville to Bozrah.

Route description
Route 163 begins as Oakdale Road at an intersection with Route 32 in the village of Uncasville within the town of Montville. It heads in a northwest direction and soon intersects I-395 (at exit 6) after half a mile. Route 163 then passes through the Palmertown community, passing in front of the Rand-Whitney company headquarters. It soon reaches the village of Oakdale, about  later, where the road makes a few turns, crosses the Oxoboxo Brook, and continues northwest for another three miles (5 km) to reach Route 82 in northwest Montville. In Bozrah, Route 163 veers to the northeast then continues for  through rural areas before ending at an interchange Route 2 (at exit 23) west of the village of Fitchville. The road continues as unsigned State Road 612 for another  to end at Fitchville Road, an old alignment of Route 2.

History
The road connecting Uncasville through Oakdale to the Norwich and Salem Turnpike (now Route 82) was designated as a secondary state highway known as Highway 364 in 1922. As part of the 1932 state highway renumbering, old Highway 364 was renumbered to Route 163, running from Route 32 to Route 82. In 1936, it was extended along former SR 655 to its current northern terminus at Route 2 in Bozrah.

Junction list

References

External links

163
Transportation in New London County, Connecticut